Plexin-B2 is a protein that in humans is encoded by the PLXNB2 gene.

Function 

Members of the B class of plexins, such as PLXNB2 are transmembrane receptors that participate in axon guidance and cell migration in response to semaphorins (Perrot et al. (2002)).[supplied by OMIM]

Interactions 

PLXNB2 has been shown to interact with ARHGEF11.

References

Further reading